The following list sorts countries and territories by their trade-to-GDP ratio according to data by the world bank. Taiwan is not included.

List 
Countries sorted by exports, imports and total trade (external trade rate) of goods and services as a share of the gross domestic product of the same year. Since GDP is only the value added domestically, it may happen that small countries export more than is produced in the country and/or import more than is consumed in the country and the external trade rate is thus over 100%. The ratios of import-to-GDP and export-to-GDP are taken from World Bank, and the trade-to-GDP ratio is calculated as their sum.

References 

Trade-to-GDP ratio